The Deadwood Creek Bridge is a covered bridge in western Lane County in the U.S. state of Oregon. Built in 1932, the  Howe truss structure carries Deadwood Loop Road over Deadwood Creek. The crossing lies upstream of the rural community of Deadwood in the Siuslaw National Forest of the Central Oregon Coast Range. The bridge was added to the National Register of Historic Places in 1979.

A concrete bridge carrying Deadwood Road bypassed the covered bridge in the 1970s, and the older structure fell into disrepair. Lane County officials decided to pay for repairs, and by 1986 the bridge was fully restored.

See also
 List of bridges on the National Register of Historic Places in Oregon
 National Register of Historic Places listings in Lane County, Oregon

References

1932 establishments in Oregon
Bridges completed in 1932
Covered bridges on the National Register of Historic Places in Oregon
Covered bridges in Lane County, Oregon
National Register of Historic Places in Lane County, Oregon
Road bridges on the National Register of Historic Places in Oregon
Wooden bridges in Oregon
Howe truss bridges in the United States